Stelman Flynn is a Canadian politician. He was elected to represent the district of Humber East in the Newfoundland and Labrador House of Assembly in a 2014 by-election. He is a member of the Liberal Party. Before being elected, Flynn served two terms as president of Hospitality Newfoundland and Labrador, one of the province's largest industry organizations.

Flynn's riding of Humber East was abolished for the 2015 provincial election. He lost the Liberal nomination for the new riding of St. George's-Humber to fellow MHA Scott Reid. Flynn unsuccessfully ran as the Liberal candidate in Humber-Bay of Islands for the 2021 provincial election.

Election results

References

External links
 Stelman Flynn

Liberal Party of Newfoundland and Labrador MHAs
Year of birth missing (living people)
Living people
21st-century Canadian politicians